Superstition is highly prevalent in Ethiopia. Like Turkey and Greece, Ethiopian culture believes in the evil eye and upholds a caste system.

Buda

The most prevalent folk religion inspired by superstition is Buda, associated with Ethiopian Jews (Beta Israel) and lower castes, primarily with local artisans and manual laborers. Manual workers are considered lower caste by the aristocratic families, socializing with their own caste. In contrast, tribal lords, spiritualists, and scholars are considered part of the highest caste. Within the social structure, manual workers socializing to the working class would be sin and impure, with such attempts resulting in them being referred to as "envious", "malevolent", and "selfish". Beads and amulets such as Kitab jewelry are worn to protect against some effects of the evil eye.

According to Niall Finneran, "the idea of magical creation underpins the perception of artisans in Ethiopia and in the wider African context. In many cases, these skills have been originally aquired from an elemental source of evil via the paternal lineage, rather like a Faustian pact."  Such supernatural powers also believd to allow one to shapeshift into animals such as hyenas. Buda is also present in Sudan, Tanzania, and among the Berber people in Morocco.

Samuel Gobat argued that some of the Beta Israel rejected the belief as a Christian superstition. He wrote "if Buda exists, you are obliged to believe that they can do nothing contrary to the will of God".

Other beliefs 
In Ethiopia, it is generally agreed upon that there are twelve harmful superstition-related practices, including: female genital mutilation, polygamy, uvulotomy, milk teeth extraction, forced marriage, food prohibition, work restriction, abdominal massaging of pregnant women, excessive feasting, unnecessary incision, and widow inheritance.

Among the  Bale Oromos, fungo is a belief that a rope will act as an object of divination. This superstition was observed during the Ethiopian Civil War, where parents went to a diviner to find their lost children, who were displaced during the war. 

Other superstitious Ethiopian practices and beliefsn include:

 Because of the relatively high rate of infant mortality in Ethiopia, a common practice is to slaughter a goat before the birth of a baby.
 The belief that if hyena scratches one's house, people feel subjected to victim of future war
 A hyena screaming is considered an omen of death for a person; two hyenas screaming signifies children would die; five to six hyenas screaming could cause the death of a woman, and seven would cause the death of a man..

Among the southern Omotic language-speaking community, mingi is a type of superstition which asserted that children born with physical abnormalities are cursed, including the top teeth coming in before the bottom teeth. Many children are killed or abandoned by drowning, putting soil in their mouths (for suffocation), strangling, or leaving infants in the forest. In July 2012, the Karo tribe officially banned the practice, but still retain the belief.

Zār

The Zār cult is widely prevalent in Ethiopia, with many Ethiopian classifying it as both malevolent and benevolent, protective spirits or adbar. Zār is also practiced by Beta Israel as well as Ethiopian diaspora living in North America and Europe, and permeated in northern Ethiopia (Amhara) with its center in Gondar. Zār was allegedly started in Harar by Harari and Somali women in Aden.

Dr. Simon Messing, a sociologist who did his work in northwestern Ethiopia (Gondar) in 1953–1954, collected 80 essays on beliefs representing 13 provinces of Ethiopia of 80 students of Haile Selassie I University.

References

Religion in Ethiopia